Paul Ipate is a Romanian actor.

Biography

Paul Ipate was born on March 17, 1985, in Bucharest, Romania. He studied acting in the Universitatea Naţională de Artă Teatrală şi Cinematografică I.L. Caragiale București.

Ipate made his film debut in The Paper Will Be Blue and went on to appear in Romanian feature films California Dreamin', Portrait of the Fighter as a Young Man and Visul lui Adalbert. He starred alongside Ioana Blaj in Bric-Brac and played the title role in Claudiu & the Fish.

Filmography

Television

Film

References

External links
 

1977 births
Living people
Romanian male actors
Male actors from Bucharest